Hellín is a city and municipality of Spain located in the province of Albacete, Castilla–La Mancha. The municipality spans across a total area of 781.66 km2. As of 1 January 2020, it has a population of 30,200, which makes it the second largest municipality in the province. It belongs to the comarca of Campos de Hellín.

History 
There is an archaeological site at Tolmo de Minateda hill near Hellín, with phases of Iberian, Roman and Visigoth occupation. There are archaeological evidences suggesting that the Minateda site may have stood at some point at the Byzantine side of the limes. A tentative identification with the Iyih mentioned in the Pact of Theodemir has been also proposed. Minateda was thus probably known as Madinat Iyyuh during the Islamic period. The Arabic name of Hellín was however Falyān, which eventually evolved into 'Felín', and then 'Hellín'.

The importance of the Sulfur-rich mining district in the south of the municipality led to the creation of a mining community in the area (Las Minas), that became a leading producer of sulfur in southwestern Europe during the 18th and 19th centuries. 

Railway arrived to the town in 1864, with the opening of the Chinchilla–Hellín stretch on 18 January and the Hellín– stretch on 8 October.

Hellín was granted the title of city (ciudad) in 1898. Esparto cultivation increased in the first decades of the 20th century, peaking in importance during the Autarky period of the Francoist dictatorship, with the expansion of irrigated crops.

Culture 
Main celebrations, such as the processions and the traditional tamborada (drumming), declared of international tourist interest, occur during the Holy Week (in Spanish, Semana Santa).

Main sights
Church of la Asunción

Notable people
 Maria Baldó i Massanet (1884-1964), teacher, feminist, folklorist, and liberal politician
 Ginés de Boluda, composer
 Juan Carlos Izpisua Belmonte, biochemist & pharmacologist
 Josico, footballer
Manuel Castells, sociologist

Twinned cities
 Paysandú, Uruguay

References
Citations

Bibliography

External links

 Official website
 Web oficial de Turismo de Hellín

Municipalities of the Province of Albacete